Ignacio José de Allende y Unzaga (January 21, 1769 – June 26, 1811), commonly known as Ignacio Allende, was a captain of the Spanish Army in New Spain who came to sympathize with the Mexican independence movement. He attended the secret meetings organized by Josefa Ortiz de Domínguez, where the possibility of an independent Mexico was discussed. He fought along with  Miguel Hidalgo y Costilla in the first stage of the struggle, eventually succeeding him in leadership of the rebellion. Allende was captured by Spanish colonial authorities while he was in Coahuila and executed for treason in Chihuahua.

Biography

Allende was born on January 21, 1769, to a wealthy Spanish criollo family in San Miguel el Grande in Guanajuato, Mexico. His father was Domingo Narciso de Allende, a wealthy trader.

In 1802, he joined the army, serving under general Félix María Calleja. In 1806, he started to favor the possibility of independence from Spain. 
His attendance at a conspiratorial meeting in Valladolid (today Morelia) was discovered, in 1809, by the Spanish and went unsanctioned. Regardless, Allende kept supporting the underground independence movement. He was eventually invited by the mayor of Querétaro, Miguel Domínguez and his wife Josefa Ortíz de Domínguez to discuss further plans for independence at their home. It was during one of these meetings where Allende met Miguel Hidalgo y Costilla and his captain Juan Aldama.

Originally, the independence movement was to be led jointly by Allende and Aldama. A change of plans prompted by the discovery of the conspiracy forced Hidalgo to start the rebellion earlier than agreed. The "Grito de Dolores" uttered  by Hidalgo signaled the beginning of the revolution, after which the conspirators rallied behind him. The rebel army quickly captured the town of Dolores and marched towards San Miguel el Grande, where Allende obtained the support of his cavalry regiment. On September 22, 1810, Hidalgo y Costilla was officially made captain general of the Revolutionary army while Allende was made lieutenant general. 
After the famous capture of the Alhóndiga de Granaditas, in Guanajuato, and his victory in the Battle of Monte de las Cruces Allende suggested Hidalgo march toward Mexico City and capture it. 
As a consequence of the rebels' defeat in the Battle of Calderón Bridge, the leadership of the Revolutionary army demanded the replacement of Hidalgo as their leader. Allende took this new responsibility and, with a decimated army, he decided to march north to the United States, with the goal of making connections with those in the United States for support.
The rebels, however, were ambushed at the Wells of Baján  due to the betrayal of Ignacio Elizondo, leading to the capture of Allende, Hidalgo, and several other commanders. Allende's illegitimate child Indalecio was killed during this ambush.

Allende was taken to the city of Chihuahua where he was tried for insubordination and imprisoned. He was informed of 2,000 Americans located near San Antonio de Bexar and asked for a meeting with the viceroy in order to contemplate a joint solution in defending a potential American invasion. His request was denied and was executed by firing squad on June 26, 1811. His body was decapitated and his head taken to the Alhóndiga de Granaditas where it was shown to the public inside a cage hung from one corner of the building. In 1824 his remains were buried in the vault reserved for the viceroys and presidents in the cathedral of Mexico. His remains were moved in 1925 to the Independence Column in Mexico City.

Legacy 
Allende is a national hero of Mexico. Places named in his honor include the municipal district and city of San Miguel de Allende in the state of Guanajuato, and the Chihuahua municipal district of Allende and its municipal seat, Valle de Allende.

See also
History of Mexico

References

External links

 Account of the Grito de Dolores, by Ignacio Allende

1769 births
1811 deaths
Mexican generals
Mexican people of Basque descent
Colonial Mexico
Independent Mexico
Military personnel from Guanajuato
People from San Miguel de Allende
Executed Mexican people
People executed for treason against Spain
People executed by Spain by firing squad
Mexican independence activists